Torta setteveli (Italian for seven-veil cake) is a seven-layer cake.Traditionally served at birthdays, it includes chocolate and hazelnuts.

This cake is composed of a base of sponge cake (without flour) of Apulian almonds, Piedmont hazelnut mousse, Madagascar chocolate and a crunchy gianduia base with cereals.

Setteveli was conceived by master pastry chefs Luigi Biasetto (Padua), Cristian Beduschi (Belluno) and Gianluca Mannori (Prato), who together make up the Italian team that with this cake won the international Coupe du Monde de la Pâtisserie award in Lyon in 1997.

The dessert is made up of a base of soft Savoyard chocolate and gianduja with cereals, a dark chocolate mousse "of origin", Bavarian praline hazelnut, and chocolate sheets.

Some replicas have been formulated in other regional contexts, including Sicily, where it has had a wide circulation, although the original recipe is protected by a legally protected company secret. In these contexts the name also differs, as the Setteveli brand has been duly registered by the creators of the recipe.

See also
 List of cakes
 List of Italian desserts and pastries

References

Italian cakes
Cuisine of Sicily
Italian desserts